Italy was the host country of the inaugural Paralympic Games in 1960 in Rome. The country fielded the largest delegation at the Games, with twenty-seven athletes (twenty-three men and four women) competing in athletics, snooker, swimming, table tennis and wheelchair fencing.

Medals 
27 of Italy's competitors won medals, in 6 sports, enabling the country to top the medal chart with 29 gold medals, 28 silver and 23 bronze.

Medalists 
The information from the International Paralympic Committee (IPC) website is based on sources which does not present all information from earlier Paralympic Games (1960-1984), such as relay and team members.</ref>

Multiple medallists 
These are official report of International Paralympic Committee.

See also
 Italy at the 1960 Summer Olympics

References

External links
Media Guide Tokyo 2020 

Nations at the 1960 Summer Paralympics
1960
Paralympics